Ohlsdorf is a railway station in Hamburg, Germany, located at the junction of the Hamburg-Altona link line with the Alster Valley line and the Hamburg Airport line in Ohlsdorf, Hamburg near the Ohlsdorf Cemetery.

History
On 6 December 1906, the Hamburg-Altonaer Stadt- und Vorortbahn (City and suburban railway) — later abbreviated Hamburg S-Bahn — opened the double track Ohlsdorf–Blankenese line. Planned as an electric railway with overhead lines, the trains were first steam powered, because of difficulties concerning the construction of the electrical installations and a delay delivering the engines.

Prior to 2008, Ohlsdorf had a bus shuttle service to bring passengers from the station to the airport. This was discontinued when a new station was constructed in the airport. An S-Bahn maintenance depot is located south-east of the station.

Services

Ohlsdorf is served by the Hamburg S-Bahn S1 and S11 lines — from Wedel in the state of Schleswig-Holstein or Blankenese to Poppenbüttel or Hamburg Airport — and Hamburg U-Bahn U1 line, from Norderstedt to Großhansdorf in Schleswig Holstein or the Hamburg suburb of Wohldorf-Ohlstedt.

Passengers travelling in the direction from the central station to the airport have to pay attention at Ohlsdorf, the last station before the airport, because all trains are split at this station. The front part (carriages 1, 2 and 3) proceeds to the airport, while the rear part (carriages 4, 5 and 6) runs to the suburb of Poppenbüttel. Signs and announcements in German and English language inform passengers. Trains pause at Ohlsdorf for about 2 minutes to couple or uncouple and to allow passengers to change to the desired half of the train.

Gallery

See also 

 Hamburger Verkehrsverbund (HVV)
 List of Hamburg S-Bahn stations
 List of Hamburg U-Bahn stations

References

External links

 Line and route network plans at hvv.de 

Hamburg S-Bahn stations in Hamburg
Hamburg U-Bahn stations in Hamburg
U1 (Hamburg U-Bahn) stations
Buildings and structures in Hamburg-Nord
Railway stations in Germany opened in 1906